Tale Heydarov (Azerbaijani: Tale Heydərov; born 9 February 1985) is an Azerbaijani businessman and investor in the educational sector.

Early life and education 
Tale attended Collingham College, London, from 2001–2003, and read for a BSc International Relations and History at the London School of Economics and Political Science (LSE) from 2003–2006. 

He achieved a Master’s degree in International Security and Global Governance from Birkbeck, University of London, in 2008.

Career 
Dedicated to education, Heydarov is currently Founder and Chairman of the European Azerbaijan School (EAS), a private co-educational day-school applying the International Baccalaureate Primary Years Programme, Cambridge International Examinations and the IB Diploma Programme. EAS is a member of the Council of International Schools network. Recently, branches have been established in London and Reading, their purpose being to provide tuition in Azerbaijani language, history, culture and music for the children of expatriate Azerbaijanis. 

Heydarov is also the Founder and Director of the Azerbaijani Teacher’s Development Centre (ATDC), which offers training from international educators for local teachers on state-of-the-art educational methodologies.

He is the Founder of Libraff, the largest bookshop chain in Azerbaijan, which has numerous stores in the capital of Baku, in addition to Ganja and Sumgayit.

Furthermore, Heydarov founded TEAS Press, which publishes books focusing on Azerbaijani history, culture, science and literature in the Azerbaijani, English, Russian and Turkish languages. It has an imprint named ‘3 Alma’, which publishes children’s literature from around the world in Azerbaijani translations. TEAS Press is also an appointed stockist of the complete suite of Cambridge ELT resources.

From 2006–2019, Heydarov was Chief Editor of Visions of Azerbaijan magazine that published articles and interviews on all aspects of Azerbaijani culture, history and international relations. 

He was formerly the Founder and Chairman of European Azerbaijani Society (TEAS), a non-governmental organisation dedicated to promoting Azerbaijan across Europe, in addition to raising awareness of the then-unresolved Armenian–Azerbaijani conflict over Karabakh. Headquartered in London, TEAS operated on a pan-European basis, opening offices in Paris, Berlin, Brussels, Istanbul and Baku. 

Heydarov was previously the Founder and President of the Qabala Sports Club, which included the football team FK Qabala. This was managed by Tony Adams from 2010–2011, former captain of Arsenal and the England national team. FK Qabala won the National Cup in 2019, and came third in the Azerbaijani Premier League from 2013–2015, thereby qualifying for the UEFA Europa League.

Awards and prizes 
In 2011, he was awarded the Progress Medal for his Contribution to the Development of the Azerbaijani Diaspora by Azerbaijani President Ilham Aliyev.

Personal life 
He is married with one daughter and two sons.

He is the son of Kamaladdin Heydarov, the Azerbaijan minister for emergency situations.

Films 
He was Executive producer of the movies:

 "Gənc səslər, qədim nəğmələr" 
 "Azərbaycan xaricilərin gözü ilə"
 "İvonna Botto-Şirməmmədovanın həyat hekayəsi".

Publications (Publisher/Editor) 
English
 International Visions: The Armenian-Azerbaijani conflict over Karabakh – From History to Future Peace Prospects. Baku, 2007
 Azerbaijan: 100 Questions Answered. Baku, 2008
 Ordubadi M.S. Years of Blood – A History of the Armenian–Muslim Clashes in the Caucausus, 1905–06. London, 2010
 The Armenian Question in the Caucasus – Russian Archive Documents and Publications. Vols. 1–3. London, 2012
 Khojaly: Witness of a War Crime – Armenia in the Dock. London, 2014

Azerbaijani
 Qafqazda "erməni məsələsi" – Rusiya arxiv sənədləri və nəşrləri üzrə. Üç cilddə. Bakı, 2011
 Foks, L. Şahə qalxan dalğalar – Yeni qlobal reallıqla qarşılaşarkən. Bakı, 2014

Russian
 Азербайджан: 100 вопросов и ответов. Баку, 2008
 «Армянский вопрос» на Кавказе. По материалам российских архивов и изданий. В трех томах. СПб., 2011
 Ордубади М.С. Кровавые годы. История армяно-мусульманской войны на Кавказе в 1905–06 годах. СПб. 2010
 Карабах: История в контексте конфликта. СПб. 2014
 Ходжалы: Очевидцы – О Военных Преступлениях Суд над Арменией, СПб., 2015

References

1985 births
Living people
Azerbaijani businesspeople
Alumni of the London School of Economics
Alumni of Birkbeck, University of London